This is a list of black metal bands (numbers 0–9 and letters A through K) including artists that have at some point in their careers played black metal.

0−9

 1349

A

 Abbath
 Abigail Williams
 Abigor
 Abominator
 Aborym
 Absu
 Absurd
 Abruptum
 Acheron
 Admonish
 Adorned Brood
 Aes Dana
 Aeternus
 Agalloch
 Agathodaimon
 Ajattara
 Akercocke
 Alastis
 Alcest
 The Amenta
 Amesoeurs
 Amestigon
 Anaal Nathrakh
 Ancient
 Ancient Rites
 ...And Oceans
 Angelcorpse
 Angizia
 Anorexia Nervosa
 Antaeus
 Antestor
 Apostasy
 Arallu
 Archgoat
 Arckanum
 Arcturus
 Arkhon Infaustus
 Armagedda
Armageddon Holocaust
 Arthemesia
 Arvas
 Asgaroth
 Ásmegin
 Asmodeus
 Astarte
 Aura Noir
 Aurora Borealis
 Averse Sefira
 Axis of Advance
 The Axis of Perdition
 Azaghal

B

 Bahimiron
 Bal-Sagoth
 Baptism
 Barathrum
 Bathory
 Behemoth
 Beherit
 Behexen
 Belphegor
 Bestial Mockery
 Bestial Warlust
 Bethlehem
 Big Boss
 Black Flame
 Black Messiah
 Black Murder
 Black Witchery
 Blasphemy
 Blood Tsunami
 Bloodthorn
 Blut Aus Nord
 Borknagar
 Botanist 
 Bulldozer
 Burzum

C

 Cadaveria
 Carach Angren
 Carpathian Forest
 Carpe Tenebrum
 Catamenia
 Celestia
 Celtic Frost
 Ceremonial Castings
 Chakal
 Chthonic
 Cirith Gorgor
 Clandestine Blaze
 Cobalt
 Code
 Cor Scorpii
 Countess
 Cradle of Filth
 Craft
 Crionics
 Cruachan
 Cultus Sanguine

D

 Daemonarch
 Dance Club Massacre
 Dark Fortress
 Dark Funeral
 Darkspace
 Darkthrone
 Darkwoods My Betrothed
 Dawn
 Dawn of Azazel
 Darzamat
 Dawn of Relic
 Deafheaven
 Deathspell Omega
 Death SS
 December Wolves
 Deinonychus
 Demoncy
 Demoniac
 Den Saakaldte
 Desaster
 Destroy Destroy Destroy
 Deströyer 666
 Destruction
 Devian
 Devilish Impressions
 Diaboli
 Diabolical Masquerade
 Diocletian
 Dimmu Borgir
 Dissection
 Dødheimsgard
 Dolorian
 Dorn
 Dornenreich
 Dragonlord
 Drastique
 Drottnar
 Drudkh

E

 Eibon la Furies
 Einherjer
 Eisregen
 Embraced
 Emperor
 Empyrium
 Endstille
 Enslaved
 Enslavement of Beauty
 Enthroned
 Ephel Duath
 Epoch of Unlight
 Equilibrium
 Ewigkeit

F

 Falkenbach
 Finntroll
 Fimbulwinter
 Fleurety
 Forefather
 Forest Stream
 Forgotten Tomb
 Frost Like Ashes
 Frosthardr
 Funeral Mist
 The Funeral Pyre

G

 Gaahlskagg
 Gallhammer
 Gates of Ishtar
 Gehenna
 Goatlord
 Goatwhore
 God Dethroned
 God Seed
 Golden Dawn
 Gorgoroth
 Gospel of the Horns
 Grand Belial's Key
 Graveland
 Graveworm
 Grimfist

H

 Hades Almighty
 Handful of Hate
 Hate
 Hate Forest
 Hecate
 Hecate Enthroned
 Helheim
 Hellhammer
 Helrunar
 Hollenthon
 Holocausto
 Holy Blood
 Horna
 Horde
 Hortus Animae

I

 I
 Ihsahn
 Ildjarn
 Immortal
 Impaled Nazarene
 Impiety
 In Battle
 In the Woods...
 Infernal
 Infernum
 Incantation
 Inquisition
 Isengard

J

 Judas Iscariot

K

 Kampfar
 Katatonia
 Keep of Kalessin
 Kekal
 Khold
 King Diamond
 Klabautamann
 Koldbrann
 Korovakill
 The Kovenant
 Krallice
 Krieg
 Kvelertak
 Kult ov Azazel

See also

List of black metal bands, L–Z
List of heavy metal bands
List of doom metal bands
List of death metal bands
List of folk metal bands
List of thrash metal bands

References

Lists of black metal bands